The Chartthaipattana Party ( Phak Chat Thai Phatthana, (CP) Thai Nation Development Party) was founded on 18 April 2008, in anticipation of the 2 December 2008, Constitutional Court of Thailand ruling which dissolved the Chart Thai Party and banned its executive members from participating in politics for five years beginning on that date. Numerous former members of the Chart Thai Party joined the Chart Thai Patthana Party; therefore, the Chart Thai Pattana party is its de facto successor.

The party has a strong base in Suphan Buri Province. The first party's leader was Chumpol Silpa-archa, the younger brother of former Prime Minister Banharn Silpa-archa, who has been banned from politics by the Constitutional Court. On 15 December 2008, the party joined the Democrat Party, forming a six-party coalition government under Abhisit Vejjajiva. In Abhisit's cabinet, the CP supplied the Deputy Prime Minister (Sanan Kachornprasart), the ministers of Tourism and Sports (Chumpol Silpa-archa), and Agriculture, and the deputy minister of transport.

For the general election on 3 July 2011, Chartthaipattana forged an alliance with coalition partner Bhumjaithai Party. The party's target was to win at least 30–35 seats and it was even hopeful that it could, as the third party, propose a "reconciliation prime minister". Eventually, the CP won 19 of the 500 seats in the house of representatives.

The party joined the Pheu Thai Party-led coalition government under Prime Minister Yingluck Shinawatra in 2011.

The party elected Kanchana Silpa-archa, daughter of former prime minister Banharn Silpa-archa, to lead them in the 2019 election. On 10 October 2022 the younger son of Banharn Silpa-archa Varawut Silpa-archa became the Leader of the Party he is 49 years old his sister the daughter of Banharn Silpa-archa had resigned as Party Leader Varawut Silpa-archa was speculated to be the Leader in 2018 but his sister Kanchana Silpa-archa had become Leader instead.

See also
 Thai Nation Party

References

Political parties established in 2008
Political parties in Thailand
2008 establishments in Thailand